AEON Bukit Indah Shopping Centre is a shopping mall in Bukit Indah, Iskandar Puteri, Johor Bahru District, Johor, Malaysia.

History
The construction of the mall started in July 2006 and was opened in December 2008. In December 2017, the shopping mall experienced blackout for several days.

Transportation
The shopping mall is accessible by bus from Johor Bahru Sentral railway station (111, 221) in Johor Bahru.

See also
 List of shopping malls in Malaysia

References

External links

2008 establishments in Malaysia
Aeon Group
Buildings and structures in Iskandar Puteri
Shopping malls established in 2008
Shopping malls in Johor